Rouko is a town in the Rouko Department of Bam Province in northern-central Burkina Faso. It is the capital of the Rouko Department and has a population of 6 247.

References

External links
Satellite map at Maplandia.com

Populated places in the Centre-Nord Region
Bam Province